Tondo is a district located in Manila, Philippines. It is the largest in terms of area and population of Manila's sixteen districts, with a Census-estimated 631,313 people in 2015 and consists of two congressional districts. It is also the second most densely populated district in the city.

Etymology 
The name Tondo can be derived from its Old Tagalog name, Tundun as inscribed in the Laguna Copperplate Inscription of 900 AD, the earliest native document found within the Philippines. Dutch anthropologist Antoon Postma, the first to translate the copperplate, believes the term tundun originated from the old Indian language Sanskrit, which was used alongside Old Malay as a language of politics and religion in the area at the time.

Before this landmark discovery, several theories (however incorrect now) existed. Philippine National Artist Nick Joaquin once suggested that it might be a reference to a high ground ("tundok"). On the other hand, French linguist Jean-Paul Potet, supposed that the river mangrove, which at the time was called "tundok" ("tinduk-tindukan" today), was the most likely origin of the name.

History

Early Philippine history

The region of Tondo has been settled by humans for over 1,100 years. Historically, Tondo already existed in the year 900 AD according to the Laguna Copperplate Inscription, a legal document that is the earliest document in the Philippines, written in Kawi now housed in the National Museum of Anthropology.

According to this document, Tondo was ruled by an unnamed person who held the Sanskrit title of senapati or the equivalent of an admiral. Tondo also had influence all the way to the modern-day province of Bulacan particularly around Lihan (Malolos) and Gatbuca (Calumpit). Tondo was ruled by a line of lakan until the Spanish conquest.

Colonial Period

After the Spaniards conquered Tondo in January 1571 they established the Province of Tondo which covered many territories in Northern Luzon particularly Pampanga, Bulacan and Rizal (formerly called Morong), with the city of Manila as its center.
In a census conducted by Miguel de Loarca in 1583, Tondo was reported to have spoken the same language as the natives of the province of Pampanga.

Institute of National Language commissioner Jose Villa Panganiban also wrote that the dividing line between Kapampangan and Tagalog was the Pasig River, and that Tondo therefore originally spoke Kapampangan. However, Fray Isacio Rodriquez's Historia dela Provincia del Santisimo Nombre de Jesus de Filipinas stated that Provincia de Tagalos which is Tondo covers all the territories of the future Archdiocese of Manila.
Prior to the establishment of the Province of Bulacan in 1578 Malolos and Calumpit were also included in the territory of Tondo as its visitas. In 1800, the Province of Tondo was renamed to Province of Manila.

Tondo was one of the first provinces to declare rebellion against Spain in the year 1896. In 1911, under the American colonial regime, there was a major reorganization of political divisions, and the province of Tondo was dissolved, with its towns given to the provinces of Rizal and Bulacan. Today, Tondo just exists as a district in the City of Manila.

Contemporary period

Slums developed in Tondo along the Pasig River. Authorities sought to improve housing conditions on these areas without condoning the action of squatting committed by the slums' residents. In the 1970s, the World Bank provided funds to improve conditions in Tondo which led the increase of rent prices and a property boom in the area. These caused the poor to be marginalized. The slums that were upgraded were legalized but these areas remain vastly different from other parts of Manila with higher population density, more irregular road and plot patterns, and uncontrolled housing.

In the 1987 constitution, Tondo split into two congressional districts of Manila making the first district to the west while the second district in the east. Paco also split by fifth and sixth congressional districts which the fifth in the south and sixth in the north.

Economy

Tondo hosts the Manila North Harbor Port, the northern half of the Port of Manila, the primary seaport serving Metro Manila and surrounding areas.

The area also hosted Smokey Mountain, a landfill which served Metro Manila and employed thousands of people from around 1960s until its closure in the late 1990s. The dumpsite served as a symbol of poverty even at least two decades since its closure.

Demographics

Crime
Tondo has developed a reputation for criminality and poverty. In 2010, Manila records state that Tondo has the highest criminal rate in the whole city with the most common crime being pick pocketing.

Culture
The district celebrates the feast of the Santo Niño de Tondo annually in January, which is dedicated to the image of the Santo Niño housed within the 16th century Augustinian Tondo Church. The Lakbayaw Street Dance Festival, a competition among Ati-Atihan groups and school, local and religious groups, served as the climax of the feast.

Education

The Manila office of the Department of Education lists 26 public elementary schools and 11 public high schools in Tondo.

List of Barangays

First District 
Zone 1: Barangays 1, 2, 3, 4, 5, 6, 7, 8, 9, and 10

Zone 2: Barangays 11, 12, 13, 14, 15, 16, 17, 18, 19, 20, 25, 26, 28, 29, 30, 31, and 32

Zone 3: Barangays 33, 34, 35, 36, 37, 38, 39, 41, 42, 43, 44, 45, 46, and 47

Zone 4: Barangays 48, 49, 50, 51, 52, 53, 54, and 55

Zone 5: Barangays 56, 57, 58, 59, and 60

Zone 6: Barangays 61, 62, 63, 64, 65, 66, 67, 68, 69, 70, 71, 72, 73, 74, and 75

Zone 7: Barangays 76, 77, 78, 79, 80, 81, 82, 83, 84, 85, 86, 87, 88, 89, and 90

Zone 8: Barangays 91, 92, 93, 94, 95, 96, 97, 98, 99, 100, 101, 102, 103, 104, 105, and 106

Zone 9: Barangays 107, 108, 109, 110, 111, 112, 116, 117, 118, 119, 120, 121, 122, and 123

Zone 10: Barangays 124, 125, 126, 127, 128, and 129

Zone 11: Barangays 130, 131, 132, 133, and 134

Zone 12: Barangays 135, 136, 137, 138, 139, 140, 141, 142, 143, 144, 145, and 146

Second District 
Zone 13: Barangays 147, 148, 149, 150, and 151

Zone 14: Barangays 152, 153, 154, 155, 156, 157, 158, 159, 160, 161, 162, 163, 164, and 165

Zone 15: Barangays 166, 167, 168, 169, 170, 171, 172, 173, 174, 175, and 176

Zone 16: Barangays 177, 178, 179, 180, 181, 182, 183, 184, 185, and 186

Zone 17: Barangays 187, 188, 189, 190, 191, 192, 193, 194, 195, 196, and 197

Zone 18: Barangays 198, 199, 200, 201, 202, 202-A, 203, 204, and 205

Zone 19: Barangays 206, 207, 208, 209, 210, 211, and 212

Zone 20: Barangays 213, 214, 215, 216, 217, 218, 219, and 220

Zone 21: Barangays 221, 222, 223, 224, 225, 226, 227, 228, 229, 230, 231, 232, and 233

Zone 22: Barangays 234, 235, 236, 237, 238, 239, 240, 241, 242, 243, 244, 245, 246, 247, and 248

Zone 23: Barangays 249, 250, 251, 252, 253, 254, 255, 256, 257, 258, and 259

Zone 24: Barangays 260, 261, 262, 263, 264, 265, 266, and 267

Notable people 
 Arturo Tolentino, Senator and lawyer
 Andrés Bonifacio (November 30, 1863 – May 10, 1897), Filipino revolutionary leader 
Lakandula or Lakan Dula (1503–1575), the last ruler of pre-colonial Tondo when the Spaniards first conquered the lands of the Pasig River delta in the Philippines in the 1570s
 Tito Arevalo, late actor
 Emilio Jacinto, Filipino general
 Mila del Sol, late actress
 Esang de Torres, singer, stage actress
 Mona Lisa, actress
 Chichay, comedian
 Dely Atay-Atayan, comedian and singer
 Amado V. Hernandez, labour leader, awarded order national artist of the Philippines
 Charito Solis, actress
 José Palma, soldier, writer
 Lualhati Bautista, novelist
 Gina Alajar, actress and tv director
 Wendell Ramos, actor and firefighter 
 Florin Hilbay, attorney
 Levi Celerio, national artist of the Philippines
 Isko Moreno, actor and former mayor of Manila
 Manny Villar, businessmen, chairman Vista Land, former president of the Senate of the Philippines 
 Ricky Belmonte (December 24, 1947 – October 3, 2001), actor and father of Sheryl Cruz.
 Ramon Ang, businessman, vice-chairman of San Miguel Corporation
 Arnold Clavio, newscaster and journalist
 Rene Requiestas (1957–1993), actor-comedian
 Dolphy, actor-comedian
 Carlos Badion, basketball player
 Ernest Obiena, pole vaulter
 RK Bagatsing, actor-model
 Vice Ganda, actor-comedian, Aldub vlogger and host
 Raymond Bagatsing, dramatic actor and model
 Jerald Napoles, actor
 Joyce Pring, actress
 Arnel Pineda, singer and the current vocalist of Journey
 Regine Velasquez-Alcasid, singer and songwriter composer
 Ramon Bagatsing, politician and the former mayor of Manila
 Willie Ong, cardiologist
 Geneva Cruz, actress, singer, and composer
 Joseph Estrada, former actor and President
 Valerie Concepcion, actress and television host
 Asiong Salonga, gangster also known as the "King of Tondo"
 McCoy de Leon, actor and dancer
 Francine Diaz, actress and model

References

Further reading
Gaspar de San Agustin, Conquistas de las Islas Filipinas 1565-1615, Translated by Luis Antonio Ma�eru, 1st bilingual ed [Spanish and English], published by Pedro Galende, OSA: Intramuros, Manila, 1998
Henson, Mariano A. 1965. The Province of Pampanga and Its Towns: A.D. 1300-1965. 4th ed. revised. Angeles City: By the author.
Loarca, Miguel de. 1582. Relacion de las Yslas Filipinas.  Blair and Robertson vol. 5 page 87:
Panganiban, J.V.  1972. Diksyunaryo-Tesauro Pilipino-Ingles. Quezon City: Manlapaz Publishing Co.
Mallat, Jean, Les Philippines: Histoire, Geographie, Moeurs, Agriculture, Idustrie, Commerce des colonies Espagnoles dans l'Oc�anie, Paris: Arthus Bertrand, Libraire de la Soci�t� de G�ographie, 1846
Santiago, Luciano P.R., The Houses of Lakandula, Matanda, and Soliman [1571-1898]: Genealogy and Group Identity, Philippine Quarterly of Culture and Society 18 [1990]
Scott, William Henry, Barangay: Sixteenth-Century Philippine Culture and Society, Quezon City: Ateneo de Manila University Press, 1994
Scott, William Henry, Prehispanic Source Materials for the Study of Philippine History, Quezon City: New Day Publishers, 1984

External links
After Fishing in Tondo, Manila, oil on canvas by Fernando Amorsolo, 1927.  58.4 x 96.5 cm.
Casas de Pescadores en Tondo ("Fishermen's Houses, Tondo"), oil on canvas by Fabian de la Rosa, 1928.  50 x 70 cm.

 
Districts of Manila
Squatting in the Philippines